The 2019 F4 British Championship was a multi-event, Formula 4 open-wheel single seater motor racing championship held across United Kingdom. The championship featured a mix of professional motor racing teams and privately funded drivers, competing in Formula 4 cars that conform to the technical regulations for the championship. This, the fifth season, following on from the British Formula Ford Championship, was the fifth year that the cars conformed to the FIA's Formula 4 regulations. Part of the TOCA tour, it formed part of the extensive program of support categories built up around the BTCC centrepiece.

The season commenced on 6 April at Brands Hatch – on the circuit's Indy configuration – and concluded on 13 October at the same venue, utilising the Grand Prix circuit, after thirty races held at ten meetings, all in support of the 2019 British Touring Car Championship.

The rookie cup continued with the top prize being free entry into the 2020 season.

Zane Maloney won both the overall and rookie championship, coming out victorious ten times out of 30 races. His closest title challenger Sebastián Álvarez won five races, one win fewer than third-placed Louis Foster. Carter Williams triumphed thrice, Josh Skelton and Luke Browning won twice respectively, and Bart Horsten and Tommy Foster got one victory each.

Teams and drivers
All teams were British-registered.

Race calendar
The calendar was announced on 5 June 2018. All races were held in the United Kingdom. Round at Rockingham was removed from the schedule in favour of the second Thruxton round. All rounds supported 2019 British Touring Car Championship.

Championship standings

Points were awarded as follows:

Drivers' standings

 Race 2 at Croft Circuit was stopped after two laps due to worsening weather conditions. The results were initially declared void, with the intention of running a fourth race at a later event. However, it was confirmed on 22 July that the original results would stand, with half points being awarded.

Rookie Cup

Teams Cup
Each team nominated two drivers to score points before every round. All non-nominated drivers were ignored.

References

External links
 

F4 British Championship seasons
British F4
F4 British Championship
British F4